There have been several races in the history of NASCAR's Nationwide Series that have been titled Pontiac 200:

 For the race known as the Pontiac Winner's Circle 200 in 1985, held at Darlington Raceway, see BI-LO 200
 For the race known as the Pontiac 200 from 1990 to 1991, held at Darlington Raceway, see Royal Purple 200
 For the race known as the Pontiac 200 from 1990 to 1991, held at Richmond International Raceway, see Bubba Burger 250
 For the race known as the Tri-City Pontiac 200 from 1985 to 1988, held at Bristol Motor Speedway, see Food City 250
 For the race known as the Pontiac 300 in 1990 and Pontiac 200 from 1991 to 1992, held at Nazareth Speedway, see Goulds Pumps/ITT Industries 200